Persephona mediterranea, the mottled purse crab, is a species of true crab in the family Leucosiidae. It is found in the western Atlantic Ocean.

References

 Nizinski, Martha S. (2003). "Annotated checklist of decapod crustaceans of Atlantic coastal and continental shelf waters of the United States". Proceedings of the Biological Society of Washington, vol. 116, no. 1, 96-157.
 Williams, Austin B., Lawrence G. Abele, D. L. Felder, H. H. Hobbs Jr., R. B. Manning, et al. (1989). "Common and Scientific Names of Aquatic Invertebrates from the United States and Canada: Decapod Crustaceans". American Fisheries Society Special Publication 17, 77.

Decapods
Crustaceans described in 1794